The World Games sports comprise all the sports contested in The World Games.

Sports
Disciplines from the same sport are grouped under the same color:

Past TWG sports and disciplines
Bodybuilding (Bodybuilding, Fitness) – Last contested in 2009
Bowling (Nine-pin bowling) – Contested only in 2005 as official
Cable wakeboard - Contested only in 2005 as official
Casting – Last contested in 2005
Flying Disc (Disc golf) – Contested only in 2001 as official
Indoor cycling (Artistic cycling, Cycle ball) – Contested only in 1989 as official
Lifesaving (Beach) – Last contested in 2009
Netball – Last contested in 1993
Roller hockey (quad skate) - Last contested in 2001
Sambo – Last contested in 1993

The following sports were part of past editions of The World Games, but have since been adopted by the Olympics as official events.
Badminton – became an Olympic sport at the 1992 Summer Olympics
Baseball and Softball – were Olympic sports from 1992 (baseball)/1996 (softball) to 2008; returned at the Olympics in 2020 as optional sports.
Beach volleyball - became an Olympic sport at the 1996 Summer Olympics
Rugby sevens – became an Olympic sport at the 2016 Summer Olympics
Taekwondo – became an Olympic sport at the 2000 Summer Olympics
Trampoline – certain individual events were introduced at the 2000 Summer Olympics
Triathlon – became an Olympic sport at the 2000 Summer Olympics
Water polo (women) - became an Olympic sport at the 2000 Summer Olympics. (Men never competed in water polo in The World Games because it has been in all Summer Olympics since 1900.)
Weightlifting (women) - became an Olympic sport at the 2000 Summer Olympics. (Men never competed in weightlifting in The World Games because it has been in all Summer Olympics since 1920.)

References

External links
The Sports of the World Games at International World Games Association web site

sports
 
Sports at multi-sport events by competition